Hazem Haj Hassen (born 15 February 1996) is a Tunisian professional footballer who plays as a forward for CS Sfaxien.

Career

Club
Haj Hassen's career started in the youth of Étoile du Sahel, before he made the move to French football to join Ligue 1 club Bordeaux. He originally featured for the club's reserves in Championnat de France Amateur (twenty-three appearances, one goal during 2014–15 & 2015–16) before making his first-team debut on 10 February 2016 in a Coupe de France defeat to Nantes. He left Bordeaux in July 2016 and was without a club until January 2017 when he rejoined Tunisian Ligue Professionnelle 1 side Étoile du Sahel. He made his debut for the club on 15 February in a league defeat versus EO Sidi Bouzid.

International
Haj Hassen represented Tunisia at U17 level, he scored one goal (vs. Argentina) in four appearances at the 2013 FIFA U-17 World Cup in the United Arab Emirates.

Career statistics
.

References

External links

1996 births
Living people
People from Sousse
Tunisian footballers
Tunisian expatriate footballers
Tunisian expatriate sportspeople in France
Expatriate footballers in France
Association football forwards
Ligue 1 players
Championnat National 2 players
Tunisian Ligue Professionnelle 1 players
Étoile Sportive du Sahel players
FC Girondins de Bordeaux players
Tunisian people of Algerian descent
Tunisia youth international footballers